The  is a section of the Tobu Isesaki line operated by the private railway company Tobu Railway, extending from Asakusa Station in Tokyo to Tōbu-Dōbutsu-Kōen Station in Saitama Prefecture. Some trains from the line continue to the Tokyo Metro Hibiya Line and Tokyo Metro Hanzōmon Line. This section was branded the Tobu Skytree Line on 17 March 2012 in conjunction with the opening of the Tokyo Skytree tower (which Tobu Railway owns). However, in through services with the Hibiya line, the Tobu SkyTree Line actually does not stop anywhere near the Tokyo SkyTree.

Description
Track
Quadruple:  −  1.3 km,  −  18.9 km
Double: Rest of the line

Note that Oshiage Station is officially an extension or part of Tokyo Skytree. The double tracks between Oshiage and Hikifune are thus the third and fourth tracks of the Tokyo Skytree − Hikifune section.

Operation
Some peak-hour Local services from Asakusa terminate at Takenotsuka, Kita-Koshigaya, or Kita-Kasukabe.

Through trains
The Skytree Line has trains that inter-run with two Tokyo Metro subway lines. The other is the Tokyo Metro Hanzōmon Line at Oshiage, running as either local, semi-express or express trains within the subway line and the Tokyu Denentoshi line.

To the north, trains run via the Yagan Railway to the Aizu Railway's Aizutajima Station.

Service patterns
Stops and operated sections are as of 2013.
Asakusa − Kita-Senju. 6 cars.
 of Tokyo Metro Hibiya Line − Kita-Senju − Takenotsuka - Kita-Koshigaya - Kita-Kasukabe - Tobu-Dobutsu-Koen - Minami-Kurihashi. 7 cars.
 (SSE)
Between Asakusa and Kita-Koshigaya, Kita-Kasukabe, Tōbu-Dōbutsu Kōen, Kuki, Tatebayashi (Isesaki Line) or Minami-Kurihashi (Nikkō Line). 6 cars.
 (SmE)
Early morning and late night. Down to Kita-Koshigaya, Tōbu-Dōbutsu-Kōen, Kuki or to Minami-Kurihashi on the Nikkō Line through from Chūō-Rinkan on the Tokyu Den-en-toshi Line via the Hanzomon Line. 10 cars.
 (SE)
Between Asakusa and Tōbu-Dōbutsu-Kōen, Kuki, Tatebayashi (Isesaki Line) or Minami-Kurihashi (Nikkō Line). 6 cars.
 (Ex)
From morning to night. Down to Tōbu-Dōbutsu-Kōen, Kuki (nearly half to Minami-Kurihashi on the Nikkō Line), through from Chūō-Rinkan on the Tokyu Den-en-toshi Line via Hanzōmon Line. 10 cars.
 <span style=background:brown>(LE)
Stops not shown. Charged for seat reservation and rapid service. Some through to/from Kuki from/to Ebisu on Hibiya Line, sole direct service named . Some through to Kasukabe from Asakusa, sole direct service named . Some through Ōmiya/Kashiwa from Asakusa, sole direct service named .

Stations

S: Stop
*1: To  on Tokyo Metro Hibiya Line.
*2: To  on Tokyu Den-en-toshi Line via Tokyo Metro Hanzomon Line
*3: Through to Nikkō Line
*4: Through to Isesaki Line
KN・KG: The stations which are marked "KN・KG" are stopped by Limited Express Kinu and Kegon trains
RM: The stations which are marked "RM" are stopped by Limited Express Ryomo trains
RV RM: The stations which are marked "RV RM" are stopped by Limited Express Revaty Kinu and Revaty Kegon and Revaty Aizu and Revaty Ryomo trains
RV KG・KN: The stations which are marked "RV RM" are stopped by Limited Express Revaty Kinu, Revaty Kegon and Revaty Aizu trains
SL: The stations which are marked "SL" are stopped by Limited Express Skytree Liner trains
UL: The stations which are marked "UL" are stopped by Limited Express Urbanpark Liner trains
TH: The stations which are marked "TH" are stopped by Limited Express TH Liner trains
KF: The stations which are marked "KF" are stopped by Limited Express Kirifuri trains
*Limited Express: Limited Express which are marked * travel to Asakusa stop at Hikifune station in the morning and they travel to Kasukabe or Tōbu-Dōbutsu-Kōen direction stop at Hikifune Station in the evening.

Notes

Rolling stock

Current
As of February 10 2023
 Tobu 10000 series (since 1984)
 Tobu 100 series (6-car EMUs, since 1990)
 Tobu 200 series (6-car EMUs, since 1991)
 Tobu 500 series (3-car EMUs, since 21 April 2017)
 Tobu 50000 series (10-car EMUs, since 2020)
 Tobu 50050 series (10-car EMUs, since 2006)
 Tobu 70000 series (7-car EMUs, since 7 July 2017)
 Tobu 70090 series (7-car EMUs, since 2020, used as TH Liner)
 Tokyo Metro 18000 series (10-car EMUs, since 7 August 2021)
 Tokyo Metro 08 series (10-car EMUs, since 2003)
 Tokyo Metro 8000 series (10-car EMUs, since 1981, started scrapping in August 2021)
 Tokyo Metro 13000 series (7-car EMUs, since 25 March 2017)
 Tokyu 2020 series (10-car EMUs, since 1 October 2018)
 Tokyu 5000 series (10-car EMUs, since 2002)

Former
 Tokyo Metro 03 series (8-car EMUs, from 1988 to 2020)
 Tokyu 8500 series (10-car EMUs, from 1975 to 2023)
 Tobu 20000 series (8-car EMUs, from 1988 to 2020)
 Tobu 30000 series (4/6/10-car EMUs, from 1997 to 2021)

History

The first section of the Isesaki Line was opened by the present company in 1899 between Kita-Senju and Kuki utilising steam motive power. In 1902, Tobu extended the line south to have a maritime connection at present Tokyo Skytree (then Azumabashi (吾妻橋), later renamed Asakusa) in downtown Tokyo, and north to Kazo. The following year a further northern extension to Kawamata (then on the south bank of Tone River) was opened. Further northward extension progressed, and in 1910 the line arrived at Isesaki. In 1931, a bridge over the Sumida River was built and present Asakusa Station (then Asakusa Kaminarimon (浅草雷門)) opened as part of the department store building, the entire line being completed.

The Asakusa to Nishiarai section was double-tracked in 1912, and the rest of the line was double-tracked between 1920 and 1927, except for the Hanyu to Kawamata section, which was double-tracked when a second bridge was built over the Tonegawa in 1992.

Electrification started in 1924 on the section of Asakusa and Nishiarai, and in 1927 completed as far as Isesaki. The distance of over 100 km was then one of the longest electrified railway lines together with the present Kintetsu Osaka Line and Yamada Lines.

After World War II, the Tobu Lines had no connection to the Yamanote Line or other major lines of the then Japanese National Railways (JNR) to offer efficient transfers to central Tokyo. The sole connection was with the Jōban Line at Kitasenju, which offered poor access to central Tokyo. To solve the inefficiencies of transfers at Kitasenju and notoriously narrow Asakusa, in 1962, the Hibiya Line of the then Teito Rapid Transport Authority (帝都高速度交通営団, Teito Kōsokudo Kōtsū Eidan), known as TRTA, present Tokyo Metro) was built, connecting at Kitasenju.

Further growing traffic required Tobu to build a second through line to Tokyo Metro Hanzomon Line in the 1990s. In 2003, the company built new tracks from Hikifune to connect at Oshiage, officially an annex station of Tokyo Skytree.

From the 3 March 2006, timetable revision, less than half of trains originated or terminated at Asakusa, with more trains operating through to Tokyo Metro subway lines.

From 17 March 2012, the section south of Tōbu-Dōbutsu-Kōen was rebranded as the Tobu Skytree Line.

The former Skytree Train and Kirifuri limited express, Rapid, and Section Rapid services were discontinued from the start of the revised timetable on 21 April 2017.

See also
 List of railway lines in Japan

References

Further reading

External links

 Tobu Railway Skytree Line information page 

 
Skytree Line
Railway lines in Tokyo
Rail transport in Saitama Prefecture
Railway lines opened in 2012
1067 mm gauge railways in Japan
Articles containing video clips